The 2007 Icelandic Men's Football League Cup was the 12th staging of the Icelandic Men's League Cup, a pre-season professional football competition in Iceland. The competition started on 16 February 2007  and concluded on 1 May 2007 with FH beating Valur 3–2 in the final after extra time.

Details
 The 16 teams were divided into 2 groups of 8 teams. Each team plays one match with other teams in the group once. The top 4 teams from each group qualified for the quarter-finals.

Group stage

Group A

Group B

Knockout stage

Quarter-finals

Semifinals

Final

See also
Icelandic Men's Football Cup
Knattspyrnusamband Íslands - The Icelandic Football Association
Icelandic First Division League 2007

References
RSSSF Page - Deildabikar 2007

Deildabikar, 2007
Deildabikar, 2007
Icelandic Men's Football League Cup